Farm to Market Road 148 (FM 148) is a farm to market road located in Kaufman County in Texas.

Route description
FM 148 begins at an intersection with State Highway 274 near Kemp just west of Cedar Creek Reservoir. The highway runs in a west–east direction from SH 274 to County Road 3094, making a 90 degree angle to the north towards Grays Prairie. FM 148 enters the town of Scurry, sharing a short overlap with State Highway 34. The highway runs in a northwest direction to Crandall before turning northeast at US 175. The highway enters the town of Talty before entering Terrell. FM 148 meets Interstate 20 and Spur 557 in a fast growing area of the town's southwest side, before seeing less development. The highway ends at an intersection with US 80, continuing north as State Highway 205.

History
FM 148 was originally designated on February 28, 1945, running from US 175 in Crandall to US 80 in Terrell. The highway was extended further south on June 28 of that year to Peeltown. FM 148 was extended again on November 1, 1961 to SH 274, absorbing Farm to Market Road 988. On June 2, 1967, it was relocated east of Peeltown, with the old route becoming FM 3094.

Junction list

References

0148
Transportation in Kaufman County, Texas